Gary James Oakes (born 21 September 1958 in Kentish Town, Camden, London) is a male British retired athlete who mainly competed in the men's 400 metre hurdles.

Athletics career
Oakes competed for Great Britain at the 1980 Summer Olympics held in Moscow, Soviet Union, where he won the bronze medal in the 400 metre hurdles. He represented England in the 400 metres hurdles event, at the 1978 Commonwealth Games in Edmonton, Alberta, Canada. Four years later he represented England, at the 1982 Commonwealth Games in Brisbane, Queensland, Australia and a third Games appearance followed when he represented England, at the 1986 Commonwealth Games in Edinburgh, Scotland. He is a member of the Haringey & Southgate Athletic Club.

Personal life
He is married to fellow two-time Olympic bronze medallist Heather Hunte.

References

External links 
 
 
 

1958 births
Living people
People from Kentish Town
Athletes from London
English male hurdlers
Olympic bronze medallists for Great Britain
Olympic athletes of Great Britain
Athletes (track and field) at the 1978 Commonwealth Games
Athletes (track and field) at the 1982 Commonwealth Games
Athletes (track and field) at the 1986 Commonwealth Games
Athletes (track and field) at the 1980 Summer Olympics
World Athletics Championships athletes for Great Britain
Medalists at the 1980 Summer Olympics
Olympic bronze medalists in athletics (track and field)
Commonwealth Games competitors for England